Ulmus × hollandica 'Commelin' is a Dutch hybrid cultivar released for sale in 1960. The tree was raised at Baarn as clone 274 by the Foundation Willie Commelin Scholten Phytopathological Laboratory  in 1940, from a crossing of Ulmus × hollandica 'Vegeta' and clone 1, an Ulmus minor selected from a 1929 elm seedlings lot obtained from the Barbier nursery, Orléans.

Description
 
A fast-growing, attractively-shaped tree distinguished by its small pale-green leaves with bright venation and a slight blue-grey color distinction from ‘Vegeta’. The leaf shape is typically elliptic, with a short acuminate apex. The leaves are sparsely arranged and fall significantly later than those of 'Vegeta'.

Pests and diseases
Although resistant to the original strain of Dutch elm disease, Ophiostoma ulmi and a range of other ailments, 'Commelin' proved very susceptible to the later, aggressive strain Ophiostoma novo-ulmi subsp. americana.

Cultivation
'Commelin' initially enjoyed considerable commercial success and over 500,000 had been sold by 1974. However, the tree had only been screened for non-aggressive or semi-aggressive isolates of the causal fungus of Dutch elm disease. When its low resistance to the new strain of the disease became apparent, sales plummeted, and only 500 were sold in 1990. However, neither 'Commelin' nor its slightly less vulnerable contemporary 'Groeneveld' had sold in great numbers beyond the Netherlands, although it was later used in hybridization experiments in the United States as female parent of several cultivars.

Notable trees
The UK TROBI Champion is at Ashton Rise in Brighton, measuring 22 m high by 55 cm d.b.h. in 2009.

Hybrid cultivars
'Homestead', 'Regal', 'Stavast', 'Urban'.

Etymology
The cultivar is named for Jan Commelin, a Dutch botanist of the 17th century.

Accessions

North America
Bartlett Tree Experts, US. No details available
Holden Arboretum, US. No details available
Morton Arboretum, US. Acc. no. 69–70

Europe
Brighton & Hove City Council, UK. NCCPG Elm Collection holders. 
Grange Farm Arboretum , Sutton St. James, Spalding, Lincs., UK. Acc. no. 840.
Wijdemeren City Council,  Netherlands. Elm Arboretum; locations Spiegelweg 1, 2 trees, Nederhorst den Berg, Parklaan (11 trees), Zuidsingel (1 tree) and 2 trees planted 2019 Strand Wijde Blik Kortenhoef.
Uithoorn, Zijdelweg 1 tree amongst group of U. x holl. ‘Vegeta’, distinguishes by its slightly blue leaves.

Nurseries

Europe
Boomwekerijen 'De Batterijen' , Ochten, Netherlands.
Lorenz von Ehren , Hamburg, Germany
Noordplant , Glimmen, Netherlands.
PlantenTuin Esveld , Boskoop, Netherlands. 
Standard Trees , Golden Cross, East Sussex, UK. 
Westerveld Boomkwekerij B.V., Opheusden, Netherlands. (as U. hollandica 'Commelin')

References

External links
"Herbarium specimen BR0000010844212". Botanic Garden, Meise. Sheet labelled Ulmus × hollandica 'Commelin'; long-shoot specimen from Jette, Belgium (1983)

Dutch elm cultivar
Ulmus articles with images
Ulmus